Sergey Vladimirovich Korsakov (Russian Cyrillic: Сергей Владимирович Корсаков; born 1 September 1984 in Frunze, Kirghiz SSR) is a Russian cosmonaut selected by Roscosmos in 2012. He was scheduled to make his first flight into space in April 2021 as a flight engineer aboard Soyuz MS-18 ahead of a stay aboard the International Space Station; but was replaced on the crew by Mark Vande Hei in March of that year. He was then assigned to Soyuz MS-21, which launched successfully March 18, 2022.

Education 
Korsakov graduated with high honors from the Bauman Moscow State Technical University in 2006 with a degree in rocketry. After his selection as a cosmonaut in 2012, he was appointed as a test cosmonaut in 2014.

References

External links 
 Spacefacts biography
 Roscosmos cosmonaut biography

1984 births
People from Bishkek
Living people
Russian cosmonauts
Bauman Moscow State Technical University alumni